BtoB 4U (stylized as BTOB 4U) is the second official sub-unit of South Korean boy band BtoB formed under Cube Entertainment. The sub-group consisted of members who have completed their military service Eunkwang, Minhyuk, Changsub and Peniel, who is exempt from conscription. They debuted on November 16, 2020, with the EP Inside, and made their debut stage on MBC Music's Show Champion on November 18.

History

2020–present: Formation and debut, Kingdom: Legendary War.
The quartet first activity as an unofficial unit at Naver Now BTOB NOW: Our Concert, a show hosted by Eunkwang, Minhyuk, Changsub and Peniel, and was air for 3 weeks starting October 27. Throughout the broadcast, the quartet performed numerous songs on 'BtoB Masterpiece One Bar Live' and communicated freely with fans through 'Real-time Q&A'. Their last episode was on November 18.

BtoB 4U is a sub-unit of BtoB, formed four years after BtoB Blue, and composed of four members from BtoB's brother line, Eunkwang, Minhyuk, Changsub and Peniel. The group was formed due to other BtoB members' military white flag. The name BtoB 4U is the name given by Minhyuk's brother. On Kang Han-na's Volume Up, Minhyuk stated "It's not my idea. My brother asked me, 'How's the name For You?'." The name contains double meaning of 'For you' and '4 members united'. It also refers to how there are four members in the unit. Other unit names that were selected after a public survey are BtoB Sky, BtoB Purple, BtoB Black, TeleToB, and SaToB (4 ToB).

On October 30, Cube officially announced their debut date with the album name Inside. On November 16, the group debuted with a moombahton dance genre song "Show Your Love" that contains a hopeful message to live and love each other even in difficult times. The song was composed by Hyunsik before he enlist in the military. BtoB 4U received their first-ever music show win on SBS MTV's The Show on November 24, 8 days after their debut. On December 2, the group released the official Japanese version of the song.

On January 28, 2021, it was officially announced that BtoB 4U would participate in Mnet competition series Kingdom: Legendary War as BtoB, due to the other members serving in the military.

Philanthropy
On November 23, 2020, BtoB 4U made a donation of 50,000 masks to Seongdong-gu office for essential workers, childcare workers who are playing their role in the field despite the prolonged spreading of COVID-19. The group expressed their gratitude, saying, "Due to [Covid-19], both children and teachers must continue to wear masks, so they will use two masks a day."

Discography

Extended plays

Singles

Other charted songs

Music videos

Filmography

Reality shows

Concerts

Notes

References

Musical groups established in 2020
2020 establishments in South Korea
Musical groups from Seoul
South Korean contemporary R&B musical groups
K-pop music groups
South Korean boy bands
Cube Entertainment artists
BtoB (band)